Flat Earth Productions is a special effects company founded by Kevin O'Neill and Doug Beswick in 1995 to provide the effects for the television series Xena: Warrior Princess and Hercules: The Legendary Journeys.

Information
Flat Earth Productions provided effects for Blade, Mortal Kombat: Annihilation and Dungeons and Dragons. The services that Flat Earth Productions include:
3D Animation
Stop Motion Animation
Compositing
Stereoscopic (3D) Post-production
On-set Supervision
VFX Photography
Complete VFX Consultation

References

External links

Flat Earth founder forms new company

Special effects companies
Entertainment companies established in 1995